The Gold Coast hinterland is an area of South East Queensland, Australia that comprises the Tweed Range, Nimmel Range, Tamborine Mountain, Numinbah Valley, eastern parts of the McPherson Range and western parts of suburban Gold Coast, such as Mudgeeraba.  This undefined unit of area is known for its tourist attractions including resorts, rainforest, lookouts, national parks, its diversity of fauna and flora and as a green backdrop to the coastal strip.  It overlaps part of the Scenic Rim and is part of both the City of Gold Coast and Scenic Rim Region and includes Springbrook, Binna Burra and O'Reilly.

History
The comprehensive exploration of the area was conducted only as late as 1842. Surveyors attempting to map the Queensland/New South Wales border during the 1860s were hampered by the rough terrain and plateaus. Shortly after timber-getters passed Numinbah Gap from the Tweed Valley, establishing a route from the Tweed region to Brisbane that was later used by coach and bullock teams. In 1908, Witches Falls was protected by Queensland's first national park declaration.

In September 2019 the area was affected by a severe bushfire season.  Binna Burra was destroyed in the fires.

Tourism
In the Gold Coast hinterland there are various scenic attractions and guesthouses that have led to the development of a vibrant tourism industry, providing a major attraction for visitors to the Gold Coast and people living in the region. Visitor surveys to the hinterland's parks and forests indicate the area is one of Queensland's most significant tourist destinations.  Wine-tasting, bird-feeding, eco-tourism and bushwalking are some of the pastimes that attract visitors to the hinterland. Other attractions in the area include O'Reilly's Guesthouse, the Natural Bridge and Binna Burra Lodge. In March 2008, the Gold Coast Hinterland Great Walk connecting the Lamington and Springbrook plateaus was opened. The moderately difficult walking trail provides  of uninterrupted track and takes three days to walk from start to finish.

Geography

This elevated area is part of the Great Dividing Range and contains the headwaters for a number of rivers and creeks including the Coomera River, Nerang River, Pimpama River, Tallebudgera Creek and Currumbin Creek. Some of the highest mountains in the hinterland are  Mount Nimmel, Tamborine Mountain, Mount Cougal, Tallebudgera Mountain and Springbrook Mountain. In New South Wales to the south are the Tweed Valley and Border Ranges, while the Scenic Rim overlaps and extends westwards from the hinterland.

Suburbs and townships
Land use in the hinterland is divided between protected areas and rural residential living. On the eastern foothills of the hinterland lie the Gold Coast suburbs of Mudgeeraba, Tallebudgera, Guanaba, Cedar Creek, Wongawallan, Mt Nathan, Maudsland and Nerang. There are a number of small villages like Advancetown, Beechmont, Lower Beechmont and Canungra that are considered part of the hinterland.

At the foot of Mount Nimmel lies Austinville and beyond, the towering plateau of Springbrook Mountain, on top of which lies a small township by the same name.

Protected areas

The region has significant natural heritage that is preserved in national parks and has been a major tourist drawcard. Much of the national parks are UNESCO World Heritage-listed as well as listed nationally as part of the Gondwana Rainforests of Australia. Remnants of early forestry history remain; there are several waterfalls, including the famous Purlingbrook Falls, and also many gorges and much rainforest.

Closer to the coast, although not technically part of the hinterland, is the Currumbin Valley Reserve.

See also

 Regions of Queensland
 Road routes in Gold Coast
 Tourism in Australia

References

South East Queensland
Geography of Gold Coast, Queensland